This list presents an overview of notable classical trombonists, including their primary affiliations and active years of playing.

Current & recent orchestral trombonists

Retired orchestral trombonists

Soloists and chamber trombonists

See also
List of jazz trombonists

References 

trombone, classical